The Ivor Preece Field on Rugby Road, Binley Woods, Warwickshire is the home ground of Broadstreet Rugby Club, designed by SR Davis architects with the sports ground designed by Peter Jones Associates, Quantity Surveyors Bucknall Austin,  project managed by Falcon House Project Management.

The first game played here was on 1 March 2001 with the official opening in August 2002. The official opening day saw world cup winning captain Martin Johnson open the club and grounds. This saw a select presidents team take on the current first XV. The ground is named in honour of Ivor Preece (1920–87), who played for and captained Coventry R.F.C. and the England national rugby union team in the 1950s and was president of Broadstreet RUFC.

The  allow up to five rugby matches and one football match to be played with two of the rugby pitches floodlit. The rugby club and facilities plays host to all manor of rugby sides on varying levels. Not only Broadstreet RFC the grounds owners, but Coventry And District Union, Warwickshire RFU, Midlands RFU for training sessions and full games and previously Premiership side Wasps for training and Premiership Rugby Shield matches.  In early 2008 for England Deaf Rugby Union in their matches against The Welsh Deaf Rugby Union in February and March saw the visit of The Scottish Deaf Rugby Union XV.

The grounds have also played host to local football sides and the Coventry Cassidy Jets American football team.

External links
 Official Site
 Official site Broadstreet RFC
 England Deaf Rugby Union Site

Rugby union stadiums in England
Sports venues in Warwickshire
Sports venues completed in 2002
2002 establishments in England